Henry K. Luning (January 24, 1905 – September 13, 1965) was an American competition swimmer who represented the United States as a 19-year-old at the 1924 Summer Olympics in Paris.  Luning competed in the preliminary heats of the men's 100-meter backstroke in the Olympics, but failed to qualify for the event final.

References

External links

1905 births
1965 deaths
American male backstroke swimmers
Olympic swimmers of the United States
Swimmers from Honolulu 
Swimmers at the 1924 Summer Olympics
20th-century American people